The 1998 Brownlow Medal was the 71st year the award was presented to the player adjudged the fairest and best player during the Australian Football League (AFL) home-and-away season. Robert Harvey of the St Kilda Football Club won the medal for the second consecutive year by polling 32 votes during the 1998 AFL season.

Harvey's tally of 32 votes tied Herbie Matthews's and Des Fothergill's long-standing 1940 record for most votes in a season under the 3–2–1 voting system.

Leading vote-getters 

* The player was ineligible to win the medal due to suspension by the AFL Tribunal during the year.

References 

Brownlow Medal
1998
Brownlow Medal